Jonathan Alan Spencer Worthington (born 16 April 1983) is an English professional football coach and former player who currently coaches Championship club Huddersfield Town's under-19 and B Teams.

Worthington previously played in the Football League for Huddersfield Town, Yeovil Town, Oldham Athletic and Bradford City and in the Conference for Fleetwood Town, Mansfield Town and FC Halifax Town. After retiring, Worthington worked as a physiotherapist at Halifax Town, before rejoining Huddersfield. Initially a physio in the club's academy, he subsequently became a youth team coach for the club.

Playing career

Huddersfield Town 
Born in nearby Dewsbury, Worthington began playing for Huddersfield Town at the age of nine, eventually moving through the club's youth academy and into the first team. He primarily plays as a hard tackling central midfielder. Many Terriers fans regarded Worthington as being the main lynchpin of the Town midfield. Other midfielders have attempted to fill that role such as Michael Collins, Andy Holdsworth, Adnan Ahmed, Mark Hudson and loan signing Ronnie Wallwork, but fans felt that the Town midfield four was incomplete without Worthington in the middle.

He was made captain in 2004 after previous captain Efe Sodje was stripped of the captaincy after being sent off in a Football League Trophy match against Blackpool which Town lost 6–3 in extra time. He was given the captaincy over Nathan Clarke who was named vice-captain.

Worthington picked up 16 yellow cards in the 2005–06 season. Another other low point was that through injury he missed Huddersfield Town's high-profile FA Cup tie against Chelsea at Stamford Bridge in 2008.

Following Andy Ritchie's departure as manager of the Terriers in 2008, Worthington was relieved of his captaincy duties by caretaker manager Gerry Murphy, so he could focus on his playing duties. The captaincy was taken up by Rob Page.

Yeovil Town 
After being out of new manager Lee Clark's plans, Worthington moved on loan to Yeovil Town on 30 January 2009. He made his debut the following day in the 1–0 win over Leyton Orient at Brisbane Road. His loan was extended by another month on 3 March, following impressive displays under new player-manager Terry Skiverton. He was recalled on 26 March. However, it was revealed on 17 April, that manager Lee Clark did not see Worthington in his future plans and said he was not going to offer him a new contract.

Oldham Athletic 
On 26 May 2009, he joined Oldham Athletic, becoming Dave Penney's second new signing after Rob Purdie.

In July 2010 he was transfer-listed by the club, along with five other first team players. He joined Fleetwood Town on loan on 18 November 2010 returning on 2 January 2011. On 25 January 2011, he joined Bradford City on a one-month emergency loan deal. He was recalled by Oldham after one match and released by the club on 27 January 2011 allowing him to seek another club before the closure of the winter transfer window.
. He then signed for Bradford on a permanent basis, signing a four-month contract.

Mansfield Town 
In June 2011, it was announced that Worthington had joined Conference Premier side Mansfield Town on a one-year deal

FC Halifax Town 
In July 2012, he joined FC Halifax Town on a one-year deal. Worthington was played in a more attacking role at Halifax than he had been used to previously in his career, but he had great success including two goals against Abbey Hey in the FA Cup in a 6–0 victory. Worthington also bagged a goal from the edge of the box on Boxing Day 2012 against Gainsborough Trinity. In January 2013, Worthington suffered an injury against Solihull Moors after going in for a challenge which won The Shaymen a penalty. He made his return against Droylsden in February and scored a goal in the 6–0 victory over The Bloods.

Coaching career 
In the summer of 2014, Worthington was appointed as player-physiotherapist at FC Halifax Town.

After retiring from playing at the end of the 2014–15 season, Worthington returned to Huddersfield Town as academy physio. Having spent four years as a physio in the Huddersfield academy, in June 2019 Worthington was appointed the club's new under-17 coach. The following year, Worthington was promoted to under-19 coach. In January 2021, he took on the additional role of B Team coach.

Career statistics

Personal life
Worthington studied at the University of Salford for a degree in Physiotherapy, graduating in 2015.

References

External links 

1983 births
Living people
Alumni of the University of Salford
Association football coaches
Association football midfielders
Association football physiotherapists
Bradford City A.F.C. players
English Football League players
English footballers
FC Halifax Town non-playing staff
FC Halifax Town players
Fleetwood Town F.C. players
Footballers from Dewsbury
Huddersfield Town A.F.C. non-playing staff
Huddersfield Town A.F.C. players
Mansfield Town F.C. players
National League (English football) players
Oldham Athletic A.F.C. players
Yeovil Town F.C. players